The year 1932 in science and technology involved some significant events, listed below.

Astronomy and space sciences
 August 10 – A 5.1 kg chondrite-type meteorite breaks into fragments and strikes earth near the town of Archie, Missouri.
 Estonian astronomer Ernst Öpik postulates that long-period comets originate in an orbiting cloud (the Öpik–Oort cloud) at the outermost edge of the Solar System.

Biology
 English geneticist C. D. Darlington publishes Recent Advances in Cytology, describing the mechanics of chromosomal crossover and its role in evolutionary science.
 English geneticist J. B. S. Haldane publishes The Causes of Evolution, unifying the findings of Mendelian genetics with those of evolutionary science.
 American physiologist Walter Bradford Cannon publishes The Wisdom of the Body, developing and popularising the concept of homeostasis.
 A flock of Soay sheep is translocated from Soay to Hirta (also in the depopulated archipelago of St Kilda, Scotland) by conservationist John Crichton-Stuart, 4th Marquess of Bute.
 The heath hen becomes extinct in North America.

Earth sciences
 Braggite is first described, the first mineral discovered with the assistance of X rays.

Mathematics
 Menger-Nöbeling theorem.
 John von Neumann makes foundational contributions to ergodic theory in a series of papers.
 Rózsa Péter presents the results of her paper on recursive function theory, "Rekursive Funktionen," to the International Congress of Mathematicians in Zurich, Switzerland.
 December – Marian Rejewski of the Polish Biuro Szyfrów applies pure mathematics – permutation group theory – to breaking the German armed forces' Enigma machine ciphers.

Medicine
 January 5 – The pathology of Cushing's syndrome is first described by Harvey Cushing.
 American gastroenterologist Burrill Bernard Crohn and colleagues describe a series of patients with "regional ileitis", inflammation of the terminal ileum, the area most commonly affected by the condition which will become known as Crohn's disease.
 Grace Medes discovers tyrosinosis, the metabolic disorder later known as Type I tyrosinemia.
 Swedish neurosurgeon Herbert Olivecrona performs the first surgical excision of an intracranial arteriovenous malformation.
 Rudolph Schindler introduces the first semi-flexible gastroscope, in Germany.
 Commencement of the 40-year Tuskegee syphilis experiment by the U.S. Public Health Service to study the natural progression of untreated syphilis in poor African-American sharecroppers in Alabama without their informed consent.
 First published use of the term Medical genetics, in an article by Madge Thurlow Macklin.
 Gerhard Domagk develops a chemotherapeutic cure for streptococcus

Pharmacology
 Albert Szent-Györgyi and Charles Glen King identify ascorbic acid as an anti-scorbutic.
 December 25 – IG Farben file a patent application in Germany for the medical application of the first sulfonamide drug, Sulfonamidochrysoidine (KI-730; which will be marketed as Prontosil), following Gerhard Domagk's laboratory demonstration of its properties as an antibiotic at the conglomerate's Bayer laboratories.

Physics
 April 14 – John Cockcroft and Ernest Walton focus a proton beam on lithium and split its nucleus.
 May – Radio Luxembourg begins high-powered longwave test transmissions aimed directly at the British Isles which prove, inadvertently, to be the first radio modification of the ionosphere.
 May 10 – James Chadwick discovers the neutron. Werner Heisenberg explains its symmetries by introducing the concept of isospin.
 August 2 – The positron is observed by Carl Anderson.
 November 1 – The Kennedy–Thorndike experiment is published, showing that measured time as well as length is affected by motion, in accordance with the theory of special relativity.
 John von Neumann rigorously establishes a mathematical framework for quantum mechanics in Mathematische Grundlagen der Quantenmechanik.
 Zero-length springs are invented, revolutionizing seismometers and gravimeters.

Awards
 Nobel Prizes
 Physics – Werner Karl Heisenberg
 Chemistry – Irving Langmuir
 Medicine – Sir Charles Sherrington, Edgar Adrian

Births
 January 16 – Dian Fossey (murdered 1985), American primatologist.
 February 7 – Alfred Worden (died 2020), American astronaut.
 February 10 – Robert Taylor (died 2017), American computer scientist.
 March 10 – Udupi Ramachandra Rao (died 2017), Indian space scientist.
 March 14 – Joseph Bryan Nelson (died 2015), British ornithologist.
 March 15 – Alan Bean (died 2018), American astronaut.
 March 21 – Walter Gilbert, American chemist and Nobel laureate
 March 24 – Lodewijk van den Berg (died 2022), Dutch-born American chemical engineer and astronaut
 April 26 – Michael Smith (died 2000), English-born biochemist, recipient of the 1993 Nobel Prize in Chemistry.
 May 22 – Robert Spitzer (died 2015), American psychiatrist.
 July 10 – Ioan Pușcaș (died 2015), Romanian gastroenterologist.
 July 31 – John Searle, American philosopher of the mind and language.
 August 4 – Frances E. Allen, American computer scientist, Turing Award winner.
 August 15 – Robert L. Forward (died 2002), American science fiction author and physicist.
 August 18 – Luc Montagnier (died 2022), French virologist and joint recipient of the 2008 Nobel Prize in Physiology or Medicine for the discovery of the human immunodeficiency virus (HIV). 
 September 18 – Nikolai Rukavishnikov (died 2002), Russian cosmonaut.
 September 29 – Rainer Weiss, German-born American physicist, joint recipient of the 2017 Nobel Prize in Physics for detection of gravitational waves.
 October 1 – Biswa Ranjan Nag (died 2004), Indian physicist.
 October 3 – Terence English, South African-born cardiac surgeon.
 October 13 – John G. Thompson, American mathematician.
 November 6 – François Englert, Belgian theoretical physicist, joint recipient of the 2013 Nobel Prize in Physics for discovery of the Higgs mechanism.
 December 15 – John Meurig Thomas (died 2020), Welsh physical chemist.

Deaths
 February 29 – George Claridge Druce (born 1850), English botanist.
 March 14 – George Eastman (born 1854), American photography pioneer (suicide).
 April 3 – Wilhelm Ostwald (born 1853), Baltic German chemist.
 April 20 – Giuseppe Peano (born 1858), Italian mathematician.
 May 29 – Cuthbert Christy (born 1863), English medical investigator, zoologist and explorer.
 June 21 – Major Taylor (born 1878), African American racing cyclist.
 July 9 – King Camp Gillette (born 1855), American inventor.
 July 14 – Fran Jesenko (born 1875), Slovene botanist and plant geneticist.
 July 22 – Reginald Fessenden (born 1866), Canadian American radio broadcasting pioneer.
 August 9 – John Charles Fields (born 1863), Canadian mathematician.
 September 16 – Sir Ronald Ross (born 1857), British physiologist.
 November 12 – Sir Dugald Clerk (born 1854), Scottish-born mechanical engineer.

References

 
20th century in science
1930s in science